Geoffrey Bluett (born 20 May 1941) is a British former tennis player.

Active on tour during the 1960s, Bluett won the South of England Championships in 1964 and qualified for four singles main draws at Wimbledon. His Wimbledon appearances included a first round win over Nicola Pietrangeli in 1968.

Bluett, a Middlesex county player, was a sports outfitter by profession.

References

External links
 
 

1941 births
Living people
British male tennis players
English male tennis players
Tennis people from Greater London